William "Bill" Walton (24 September 1874 – 1 June 1940) was an English rugby union, and professional rugby league footballer who played in the 1890s and 1900s. He played representative level rugby union (RU) for England and Yorkshire, and at club level for Castleford RUFC (in Castleford, Wakefield), as a forward, and representative level rugby league (RL) for Yorkshire, and at club level for Wakefield Trinity (Heritage № 20) (captain), as a forward (prior to the specialist positions of), during the era of contested scrums. William Walton made his début for Wakefield Trinity, and scored Wakefield Trinity's first ever try under Northern Union (RFL) rules, in the 15-9 victory over Wigan at Belle Vue, Wakefield on Saturday 21 September 1895.

Background
Bill Walton worked as licensed victualler, and he died aged 65 in Wakefield, West Riding of Yorkshire, England.

Rugby union playing career

International honours
William Walton won a cap for England (RU) while at Castleford in the 0-6 defeat by Scotland at Raeburn Place, Edinburgh on Saturday 17 March 1894.

County honours
William Walton won caps for Yorkshire (RU) while at Castleford during 1893-94, and won caps for Yorkshire (RL) while at Wakefield Trinity during 1895-99.

Rugby league playing career

County honours
William Walton won caps for Yorkshire (RL) while at Wakefield Trinity.

Club career
William Walton made his début for Wakefield Trinity during September 1895, he appears to have scored no drop-goals (or field-goals as they are currently known in Australasia), but prior to the 1974–75 season all goals, whether; conversions, penalties, or drop-goals, scored 2-points, consequently prior to this date drop-goals were often not explicitly documented, therefore '0' drop-goals may indicate drop-goals not recorded, rather than no drop-goals scored. In addition, prior to the 1949–50 season, the archaic field-goal was also still a valid means of scoring points.

References

1874 births
1940 deaths
Castleford R.U.F.C. players
England international rugby union players
English rugby league players
English rugby union players
Footballers who switched code
Place of birth missing
Rugby league forwards
Rugby league players from Yorkshire
Rugby union forwards
Rugby union players from Yorkshire
Wakefield Trinity captains
Wakefield Trinity players
Yorkshire County RFU players
Yorkshire rugby league team players